The 1979 World Table Tennis Championships – Swaythling Cup (men's team) was the 35th edition of the men's team championship.  

Hungary won the gold medal defeating China 5–1 in the final. Japan won the bronze medal.

Medalists

Swaythling Cup tables

Group A

Group B

Semifinals

Third-place play off

Final

See also
List of World Table Tennis Championships medalists

References

-